Fear of the Dark is a 2003 Canadian horror film directed by K.C. Bascombe.

Cast
Kevin Zegers - Dale Billings
Jesse James - Ryan Billings
Rachel Skarsten - Heather Fontaine
Charles Powell - Eric Billings
Linda Purl - Sandy Billings

External links

2003 films
2003 horror films
Canadian horror films
English-language Canadian films
2000s English-language films
2000s Canadian films